The Grande Prairie Kings, formerly the Grande Prairie Wheelers until April 2011, are a Junior "B" Ice Hockey team based in Grande Prairie, Alberta, Canada. They are members of the North West Junior Hockey League (NWJHL). The Kings moved from the Coca-Cola Centre to the Crosslink Sports Centre in January 2014, which has a capacity of 600.

History 
The Kings (formerly the Wheelers) joined the NWJHL when the league began operations in 1994.  It took the Kings nearly 20 years to capture their first league championship but did so on March 26, 2013.

In the 2013-2014 NWJHL season the Kings hosted the Hockey Alberta Investors Group Junior B Provincial Championship. Despite losing the NWJHL finals to the North Peace Navigators, Grande Prairie had already secured a spot as tournament host.  The Kings captured a silver medal falling 6 to 0 to the Blackfalds Wranglers in the provincial final.

Season-by-season record 

Note: GP = Games played, W = Wins, L = Losses, OTL = Overtime Losses, Pts = Points, GF = Goals for, GA = Goals against, PIM = Penalties in minutes

Russ Barnes Trophy
Alberta Jr B Provincial Championships

External links 
Official website of the Grande Prairie Kings

References 

Ice hockey teams in Alberta
Sport in Grande Prairie
1994 establishments in Alberta